Pulivalu is a 1975 Indian Malayalam film  directed by J. Sasikumar and produced by V. M. Chandi, with Prem Nazir, Jayabharathi, Jose Prakash and Sreelatha Namboothiri in the lead roles. Its score was composed by M. K. Arjunan.

Cast

Prem Nazir
Jayabharathi
Jose Prakash
Sreelatha Namboothiri
M. G. Soman
Manju Bhargavi
Meena
Muthukulam Raghavan Pillai
Veeran

Soundtrack
The music was composed by M. K. Arjunan and the lyrics were written by Sreekumaran Thampi.

References

External links
 

1975 films
1970s Malayalam-language films
Films directed by J. Sasikumar